Brutal is a 1980 Filipino film directed by Marilou Diaz-Abaya with a screenplay by Ricky Lee.

It was the first major Filipino film to tackle rape as a feminist issue. Brutal was followed by Moral (1982) and Karnal (1983), a loose trilogy of feminist films directed by Abaya and written by Lee.

Cast

Production 
After the success of her directorial debut Tanikala (1980), Marilou Diaz-Abaya was approached by producer Jesse Ejercito to direct a film for him starring Amy Austria, who had recently distinguished herself in the 1979 Lina Brocka film Jaguar.

Reception

Accolades

References 

1980 films
Philippine drama films
1980 drama films
1980s Tagalog-language films
Films set in the Philippines
Films directed by Marilou Diaz-Abaya
Films about rape